Neil Kruger (born 15 August 1981 in Cape Town, South Africa) is a first-class cricketer, who made his debut for Oxford University cricket team in 2008, scoring 172 in the Varsity Match. Since June 2011, he has also represented the Netherlands.

A Rhodes Scholar and orthopedic surgeon, he studied at Green Templeton College of the University of Oxford. He held a scholarship for sporting achievement from Green Templeton College. He also played varsity golf.

References

External links

1981 births
Living people
Alumni of Green Templeton College, Oxford
Oxford University cricketers
South African cricketers
Dutch cricketers
Netherlands One Day International cricketers
Cricketers from Cape Town
Oxford MCCU cricketers